The Harker School is a private, non-profit school located in San Jose, California. Founded in 1893 as Manzanita Hall, Harker now has three campuses: Bucknall, Union, and Saratoga, named after the streets on which they lie.

About 
The Bucknall campus houses the Lower School (kindergarten through grade 5), the Union campus houses the Middle School (grades 6-8), and the Saratoga campus houses the Upper School (grades 9 through 12).

Harker School's tuition is significantly higher than most comparable private schools in the Bay Area. Many of the 35+ after-school programs have historically been included in the tuition.

History 

The Harker School was founded as three distinct schools, which merged in 1972 to form Harker Academy and in 1993, Harker School.

Manzanita Hall and Palo Alto Military Academy 
In 1891, founding Stanford University president David Starr Jordan influenced Frank Cramer to open the Palo Alto Preparatory School for Boys. The school was renamed Manzanita Hall in 1892, and by September 1894 the school had enrolled 24 students. In 1893, the school was a boys day school and boarding school, by the name of Manzanita Hall founded by Frank Cramer. The Manzanita Hall school was originally located at 1129 Parkinson Avenue in Palo Alto, California. In 1915, the enrollment was 60 boys. in 1919, Manzanita Hall  was purchased and renamed as Palo Alto Military Academy, and that school remained until 1972.

Miss Harker's School 
In 1902, Miss Harker's School was founded by Cathrine Harker as a girls day school, with a limited boarding school, also located in Palo Alto. In 1917, the enrollment was 40 girls and was served as a preparatory school for competitive colleges such as Stanford University. From 1902 to 1907, Miss Harker's School was located at 1121 Bryant Street in Palo Alto; and moved to 1050 Greenwood Avenue in Palo Alto, where the campus grew in size and the nearby streets were renamed (Melville and Harker Street) to reflect the campus.

Harker Academy 
In 1972, there was a merger between the Palo Alto Military Academy and Miss Harker's School  in order to form the Harker Academy. With the merger, the school moved to 500 Saratoga Avenue in San Jose, California. in 1993, the school name changed to Harker School.

In 1954, the Harker School joined the California Association of Independent Schools (CAIS) and the Western Association of Schools and Colleges.

Campus

Upper school 
The upper school, offering grades 9 through 12, is located on the Saratoga Avenue campus. The campus was previously home to an all-girls school, Mother Butler Memorial High School, which merged with Archbishop Mitty High School in 1969. The upper school was added to the K-8 program in 1998, with the first class of graduates in 2002.

Middle school 
The middle school is located on the Union campus, the former site of the Harker Preschool. Since the opening of the upper school in 1998, most students choose to remain at Harker School after middle school. Many components ease the shift from the lower school to the middle school, including various athletic and artistic programs. There is also a fine arts requirement: students in grades 7 and 8 must take at least one arts class or participate in one art event in order to graduate (sixth graders are encouraged to do so, as well).

Lower school 
The elementary school is located on the Bucknall campus, the former site of Bucknall Elementary School. The campus was sold to Harker School by the Moreland School District, and classes started there in the 1998–1999 school year. The lower school also has an after-school orchestra, as well as sports and other activities.

Academics

Academic Olympiad competitions
Harker school started competing at US Physics Olympiad in 2004 with Yi Sun winning the gold medal at International Physics Olympiad as part of the US team at South Korea. In 2009, a record 3 students made the final 24, and Anand Natarajan of Harker School, representing the US team won the gold medal in Mexico.

Science research competitions

In the Siemens Competition, Harker School had four national semi-finalists in both 2006 and 2007, and six in 2008. In 2012, Harker had four regional finalists and six semifinalists: one-fourth of the regional finalists in California were from The Harker School.

The Harker School started participating in the Intel/Regeneron Science Talent Search competition with its first graduating class of 2002. Between the first graduating class of 2002 until 2019 Harker high school has produced a record 92 semi-finalists and 18 finalists. In just 17 years Harker High School has become one of the top three high schools in the USA with a total number of 18 finalists and top ten high schools in the total number of 92 semi-finalists..

In the Intel Science Talent Search, a Harker student won the $75,000 second place award in 2006. From 2007 to 2009, 12 Harker School seniors were named national semifinalists, the largest number of any school west of the Mississippi in those years. In 2010, Harker School had another Intel finalist,. In 2011, Harker School had seven semifinalists and was the only school with two Intel finalists. In 2012, Harker School had 11 Intel semifinalists, the most in California and second in the nation behind Stuyvesant High School in New York. In 2013, Harker School again had six Intel semifinalists, the most in California for the second year in a row, and one finalist. In 2014 Intel STS Harker had 10 semi-finalists, most of any school in California and one finalists. In 2015 Intel STS Harker had record 15 semi-finalists, most of any school in the USA and three finalists, again most of any school in USA with a student winning the first prize of $150,000. In 2016 Intel STS Harker had four semi-finalists and one finalists.

In the 2019 Regeneron Science Talent Search competition, Harker had seven semi-finalists, the most of any school in California and three finalists, tied with another school as the most of any school in USA. In 2018 Regeneron STS Harker had six semi-finalists, tied as most of any school in California and two finalists. In 2017 Regeneron STS Harker had nine semi-finalists, tied as most of any school in USA with two other schools and had three finalists most of any school alone in USA.

Athletics
Harker School offers an athletics program which includes football, volleyball, soccer, track and field, basketball, baseball, tennis, golf, softball, lacrosse, cross country running, swimming, water polo, wrestling, cheerleading, yoga, fitness, physical education, and dance. Students are encouraged to participate in sports from 4th grade onwards. In August 2017, Harker finished construction on their new athletic center on the upper school campus.

Performing arts 
Harker School offers a K–12 performing arts program. The upper school program offers courses in vocal and instrumental ensembles, acting, dance, and technical theater, as well as a program named the Certificate Program. In February 2018, Harker opened a new performing arts building on the Saratoga campus, which includes a 463-seat theater, dressing rooms and practice rooms, and a Bosendorfer 214VC CS grand piano.

Publications

Harker has student-run journalistic publications: newspaper (Winged Post), yearbook (Talon), news website (Harker Aquila, formerly talonwp.com), and news magazine (Wingspan), as well as a social media presence. Harker also has a science research magazine, Harker Horizon, which has an online presence and printed its inaugural issue in 2017. In addition, Harker began an economics magazine, Equilibrium, in 2019, and will maintain both an online presence and print its inaugural version in Summer 2020. The school's art and literature magazine (HELM), has published 17 print issues as of late 2017.

Notable alumni and faculty
Priscilla Chan (former faculty in 2007 to 2008), philanthropist and pediatrician; wife of Mark Zuckerberg. 
Andy Fang (class of 2010), Billionaire Co-Founder and CTO of DoorDash.
Maverick McNealy (class of 2013), number one ranked golfer in the World Amateur Golf Ranking; son of Scott McNealy.
Andrea Nott, Olympic synchronized swimmer
John B. Owens, Judge of the United States Court of Appeals for the Ninth Circuit
Robert Rothbart (born Boris Kajmaković in 1986), Bosnian-Israeli-Serbian professional basketball player playing center for Ironi Nahariya in Israel
Alexander Wang, fashion designer and former creative director of Balenciaga; named one of Times "100 Most Influential People" in the artists category in 2015
Matt Wolf, documentary filmmaker; director and producer of Teenage

References

External links 
 Harker's homepage

Private K-12 schools in California
Preparatory schools in California
Performing arts education in the United States
Educational institutions established in 1893
High schools in San Jose, California
Private schools in San Jose, California
1893 establishments in California